Milora is a rural locality in the Scenic Rim Region, Queensland, Australia.

History
Milora Wesleyan Methodist Church opened in 1869. Tenders were called in October 1869. It was opened circa January 1870, celebrating its anniversary on 21 January 1871.

Milora State School opened on 20 April 1873 and closed on 27 July 1962. It was near the north-west corner of Munbilla Road and Goames Road (approx ).

The locality contains 38 households, in which 48.6% of the population are males and 51.4% of the population are females with a median age of 51, 13 years above the national average. The average weekly household income is $1,218, $220 below the national average.

References

Further reading 

  — also covers Hillgrove, Milora and Radford Schools

Scenic Rim Region
Localities in Queensland